Leonide or Léonide is a masculine given name which may refer to:

 Leonide or Leonid of Georgia (1861–1921), Catholicos-Patriarch of All Georgia
 Leonid Berman (1896–1976), Russian Neo-romantic painter and theater and opera designer
 Léonide H. Cyr (1926–2009), Canadian politician
 Léonide Massine, French transliteration of Leonid Fyodorovich Myasin (1896–1979), Russian choreographer and ballet dancer
 Léonide Moguy (1899–1976), born Leonid Mogilevsky, Russian-born French film director, screenwriter and film editor

See also
 Leonid, another given name

Masculine given names